National Highway 316 (NH 316) is a  National Highway in India. It connects Bhubaneshwar and Puri - Satpada in Odisha.

References

National highways in India
Transport in Puri